The 2009–10 Iraqi Premier League (known as the Zain Iraq League for sponsorship reasons) was the 36th edition of the competition. It was initially set to start in October 2009, but was later rescheduled for December as a 36-team league. The season saw Duhok crowned as champions for the first time.

Name changes
 Al-Amana renamed to Baghdad.
 Al-Etisalat wal-Bareed renamed to Al-Etisalat.

Group stage

North Group

Note: Sulaymaniya withdrew from the league and were relegated.

Results

South Group

Results

Elite stage

Group 1

Group 2

Group 3

Ranking of second-placed teams

Golden stage

Semi-finals

First legs

Second legs

Al-Talaba won 1–0 on aggregate

Duhok won 5–2 on aggregate

Third place match

Final

Match officials
Assistant referees:
Jalil Saifi
Maitham Khamat
Fourth official:
Samir Shabib

Match rules
90 minutes.
30 minutes of extra-time if necessary.
Penalty shootout if scores still level.

Final positions

Season statistics

Top scorers

Hat-tricks

Notes
4 Player scored 4 goals

References

External links
 Iraq Football Association

Iraqi Premier League seasons
1
Iraq